Tashar (also Romanized as Tashār) is a village in Sirvan Rural District, Nowsud District, Paveh County, Kermanshah Province, Iran. At the 2006 census, its population was 280, in 75 families.

References 

Populated places in Paveh County